Joanna Cooper (born 29 January 1994) is an Irish actress, model and beauty pageant titleholder who was crowned Miss Universe Ireland 2015 and represented Ireland at the Miss Universe 2015.

Pageantry
Cooper was crowned as Miss Universe Ireland 2015 and represented County Londonderry. She later competed at the Miss Universe 2015, but didn't make the Top 15.

References

Miss Universe Ireland winners
Actors from Derry (city)
Irish female models
Miss Universe 2015 contestants
1994 births
Living people
Beauty pageant contestants from Ireland
Models from Derry (city)